Vir philippinensis, sometimes referred to as the bubble coral shrimp, is a species of saltwater shrimp that was first described in 1984.

Distribution
Vir philippinensis is found from the Red Sea to the Indo-Pacific, including Indonesia, Japan, Myanmar, the Philippines, Australia and Papua New Guinea.

References

External links
 

Palaemonoidea
Crustaceans described in 1984